Colin Jones may refer to:
 Colin Jones (artist) (1928–1967), Welsh artist
 Colin Jones (boxer) (born 1959), Welsh boxer
 Colin Jones (footballer, born 1940) (1940–2016), English footballer for Chester
 Colin Jones (footballer, born 1963), English footballer for Mansfield Town
 Colin Jones (historian) (born 1947), British historian of France
 Colin Jones (priest), Dean of St. George's Cathedral, Cape Town
 Colin Jones (American football) (born 1987), American football safety
 Colin Jones (photographer) (1936–2021), English photographer
 Colin Jones (gambler), blackjack card-counting expert, teacher, and entrepreneur